Taenaris dioptrica is a butterfly in the family Nymphalidae. It was described by Samuel Constantinus Snellen van Vollenhoven in 1860. It is found in New Guinea in the Australasian realm.

Subspecies
T. d. dioptrica (New Guinea, Salawati, Jobi Island)
T. d. licinia  (Fruhstorfer, 1904)  (Jobi Island
T. d. rileyi  Hulstaert, 1925 (New Guinea - Oetakwa River, Eilanden River)
T. d. amitaba  (Fruhstorfer, 1904)  (Waigeu)
T. d. helice  (Brooks, 1944)  (Gebe Island)

References

External links
Taenaris at Markku Savela's Lepidoptera and Some Other Life Forms

Taenaris
Butterflies described in 1860
Butterflies of Oceania
Taxa named by Samuel Constantinus Snellen van Vollenhoven